Eumeella is a genus of flies in the family Tachinidae.

Species
E. latifrons Chao & Zhou, 1996
E. perdives (Villeneuve, 1926)

References

Exoristinae
Diptera of Europe
Diptera of Asia
Tachinidae genera